Vlasovo is a rural locality (a village) in Samotovinskoye Rural Settlement, Velikoustyugsky District, Vologda Oblast, Russia. The population was 5 as of 2002.

Geography 
The distance to Veliky Ustyug is 39 km, to Novator is 21 km. Stepanitsa is the nearest rural locality.

References 

Rural localities in Velikoustyugsky District